Ethylene bis(iodoacetate), also known as S-10, is the iodoacetate ester of ethylene glycol. It's an alkylating agent that has been studied as an anticancer drug.

See also 
Ethylene glycol
Iodoacetic acid
Ethyl iodoacetate
Iodoacetamide

References 

Alkylating agents
Iodoacetates
Glycol esters